Deir Sunbul, Idlib  is a Syrian village located in Ihsim Nahiyah in Ariha District, Idlib.  According to the Syria Central Bureau of Statistics (CBS), Deir Sunbul, Idlib had a population of 1751 in the 2004 census.

During the Syrian civil war, Deir Sunbul was occupied by Al Nusra and then Hayat Tahrir al-Sham (HTS), an Al-Qaeda linked group, which destroyed a 5th or 6th century Byzantine villa in the archaeological site of Deir Sunbul on 5 October 2017.

References 

Populated places in Ariha District
Villages in Idlib Governorate